Atlas Personal–Jakroo was a Swiss UCI Continental cycling team that was founded in 2007 and disbanded in 2013.

The team was based in Germany for the 2007 season, but moved to Switzerland in 2008.

References

Defunct cycling teams based in Switzerland
Cycling teams based in Switzerland
Cycling teams established in 2007
Cycling teams disestablished in 2013
UCI Continental Teams (Europe)